Charaxes contrarius is a butterfly in the family Nymphalidae. It is found along the coasts of Kenya and Tanzania.
 The habitat consists of lowland forests, heavy coastal woodland and riverine vegetation at altitudes of near sea-level up to 700 meters.

The larvae feed on Albizia species.

Subspecies
C. c. contrarius - Coastal and Eastern parts of Kenya and Tanzania.
C. c. lukosi Rydon, Congdon & Collins, 2007  - Inland at Kitonga Gorge, Lukosi R., in Udzungwa Mts., Tanzania

Taxonomy
Charaxes contrarius is a member of the large species group Charaxes etheocles

Closely related to Charaxes etheocles, Charaxes grahamei and Charaxes petersi. The female has two
main forms

References

Victor Gurney Logan Van Someren, 1969 Revisional notes on African Charaxes (Lepidoptera: Nymphalidae). Part V. Bulletin of the British Museum (Natural History) (Entomology)75-166.

External links
African Charaxes/Charaxes Africains Eric Vingerhoedt taxonomy, images
Charaxes contrarius images at Charaxes page Consortium for the Barcode of Life subspecies and forms
Images of C. contrarius Royal Museum for Central Africa (Albertine Rift Project)
African Butterfly Database Range map via search

Butterflies described in 1969
contrarius